AVCOAT 5026-39 is a NASA code for a specific ablative heat shield material created by Avco (acquired by Textron in 1984).
It is an epoxy novolac resin with special additives in a fiberglass honeycomb matrix. In fabrication, the empty honeycomb is bonded to the primary structure and the resin is gunned into each cell individually.

History
AVCOAT was used for the heat shield on NASA's Apollo command module. In its final form, this material was called AVCOAT 5026-39.

Although AVCOAT was not used for the Space Shuttle orbiters, NASA is using the material for its next generation Orion spacecraft. The Avcoat to be used on Orion is reformulated to meet environmental legislation that has been passed since the end of Apollo.

Specifications
Material: epoxy phenol formaldehyde resin with special additives in a fiberglass honeycomb matrix.
Density:  

Notable AVCOAT Installations

AVCOAT for Orion Crew Module 
The Orion Crew Module was first designed for the NASA's Constellation program, but later adapted the Space Launch System to replace the Space Shuttle program. This spacecraft was planned to take astronauts to the International Space Station in 2015 and to the moon in 2024.

In the past, the honeycomb paste-like fiberglass material is gunned into each cells individually. On the other hand, the Orion heat shield is bonded onto the base of the heat shield.

To protect the Crew Module during Earth re-entry, the dish shaped AVCOAT heat shield ablator system was selected. NASA announced that this module will encounter temperature as high as 5,000 degrees Fahrenheit (2760°C). Licensed by Textron, AVCOAT material is produced at New Orleans's Michoud Assembly Facility by Lockheed Martin. This heat shield will be installed at the base of the crew module to provide a controlled erosion moving heat away from the crew module into the atmosphere. This process of erosion is called “ablation” - where materials are removed by vaporization or erosion by continuous contact with the supersonic velocity of gas flow and high temperature; thus the construction of honeycomb structure was made.

John Kowal, Orion's thermal protections systems manager at Johnson Space Center, discussed the biggest challenge with AVCOAT has been reviving the technology for manufacturing with similar performance as demonstrated in the Apollo Missions.

The EFT-1 mission performed two orbits of Earth providing the opportunity for Orion's systems to be tested. It took about four hours with the splash down in the ocean.

AVCOAT for Apollo Missions 
AVCOAT was first used on the parts of the Apollo spacecraft orbiter and as a unit attached to the crew module in the past. It is a honeycomb structure. NASA confirmed that this is made of silica fibers with an epoxy novolac resin filled in a fiberglass-phenolic manufactured directly onto the heat shield.

NASA's Apollo Flight Test Analysis, AVCOAT 5026-39/HC-G material was tested on the nose cap of a peacemaker vehicle. The temperature and ablation measurements were made at four locations on the nose cap. The report noted that the wear of the shield is due to the aerodynamic shear and heating rate. The report also noted that scientists believed that the ablation was done in a controlled manner.

After the Apollo missions, the production was then put in place for the purpose of studying. Orion Chief Engineer requested the heat shield to be redesigned, however the final design was not selected.

AVCOAT Heat Shield Research and Installation for Orion Crew Module 
The AVCOAT material heat shield went through several rounds of testing before being chosen for the installation. During the investigation of the thermochemical response of Avcoat TPS (based on first principles for comparison with EFT-1 data), things being tested on the heat-shield included: modeling of gas transport, heat transfer, and TPS material regression.

Orion's 16.5 feet AVCOAT heat shield was secured onto the Orion Crew Module using 68 bolts by Technicians at NASA's Kennedy Space Center (KSC) in Florida. This heat shield is covered in titanium truss and a composite substitute with an addition skin made of carbon fiber layers. 
Orion's heat-shield was designed and manufactured by Lockheed Martin. The heat shield is like pieces of a honeycomb puzzle that all must fit together perfectly and the bolt fittings must be lined up.

After the heat-shield's installation, access to components of the crew module became difficult or no longer accessible.

Flight use

Uncrewed 
Several subscale test flights
AS-201
AS-202
Apollo 4
Apollo 6
EFT-1
Artemis 1

Crewed
Apollo 7, Apollo 8, Apollo 9, Apollo 10
Apollo 11, Apollo 12, Apollo 13, Apollo 14
Apollo 15, Apollo 16, Apollo 17
Skylab 2, Skylab 3, Skylab 4
Apollo–Soyuz Test Project

References

External links
 Apollo Experience Report - Thermal Protection Subsystem (Jan. 1974)
 Apollo Seals: A Basis for the Crew Exploration Vehicle Seals (Nov. 2006)
 Notes on Earth Atmospheric Entry for Mars Sample Return Missions (Sept. 2006)

Spacecraft components